The following is a list of protected areas and preserves within the Great Lakes area.

 Alger Underwater Preserve
 Apostle Islands National Lakeshore
 Calumet Shoreline
 De Tour Passage Underwater Preserve
 Glenwood Shoreline
 Grand Traverse Bay Bottomland Preserve
 Fathom Five National Marine Park
 Indiana Dunes National Park
 Keweenau Underwater Preserve
 Lake Superior National Marine Conservation Area
 Manitou Passage Underwater Preserve
 Marquette Underwater Preserve
 Pictured Rocks National Lakeshore
 Sanilac Shores Underwater Preserve
 Sleeping Bear Dunes National Lakeshore
 Southwest Michigan Underwater Preserve
 Straits of Mackinac Shipwreck Preserve
 Thumb Area Bottomland Preserve
 Thunder Bay National Marine Sanctuary and Underwater Preserve
 Whitefish Point Underwater Preserve

Marine protected areas
Michigan geography-related lists
Great Lakes